Zott (singular Zottī) is the Arabic term for gypsies, Romani people, and Dom people. The Zott were musicians who migrated in great numbers from northern India to the Middle East about 1000 years ago. Their name was later applied to any itinerant entertainer of Indian origin; and came to be the common name of the Dom people in the Middle East, as English gypsy or tinker with contemptuous connotations. The Al-Qamus Al-Muhit glosses the term as equivalent to Nawar (singular Nawarī). "Zutt" is also a Arabicised form of Jats.

See also
Jats
Jat of Afghanistan
Nawar
Romani

References

M. J. de Goeie, A Contribution to the History of the Gypsies, Amsterdam (1875, 2007 reprint)
 
 

Dom in Asia
Dom people
Indian diaspora
Nawar people
Nomadic groups in Eurasia
Pakistani diaspora
Romani in Iran